"Greeks Bearing Gifts" is the seventh episode of the first series of the British science fiction television series Torchwood, which was originally broadcast on the digital television channel BBC Three on 26 November 2006.

In the episode, a killer shape-changing alien called Mary (Daniela Denby-Ashe) has been stranded in Cardiff for nearly two hundred years. She seeks to retrieve a recently unearthed transporter so she can escape the planet Earth.

Plot
Torchwood is called to a building site where a centuries-old human skeleton and a rusted alien artefact have been discovered in the ground. Later, at a local bar, Toshiko meets Mary, a scavenger of alien artefacts that has been following Torchwood. Mary gives Toshiko a pendant that allows her to read minds; Toshiko promises to not tell Torchwood from whom she got it.

The next day as Toshiko examines the pendant, she reads Owen and Gwen's minds, both having dismissive and contemptuous thoughts about her. She races home, only to find Mary there; Toshiko attempts to return the pendant but Mary insists it can be used for good. Mary convinces Toshiko to read her mind again, and reveals romantic intentions for Toshiko. The two spend the night together. The next day, Toshiko asks Mary her true identity but she remains coy, answering "Philoctetes", the name of an archer from Greek mythology who was exiled on an island. Toshiko wears the pendant in a crowded street, and though overwhelmed with the thoughts of everyone, identifies one man preparing to commit murder, and she is able to follow and stop him.

Later, Mary convinces Toshiko to ask the others at the Hub about the artefact, using the pendant as they may be hiding information from her. Toshiko finds Owen lacks any information on the artefact, while she is unable to read Jack's mind. Meanwhile, Owen has discovered that the same trauma that had been inflicted on the skeleton has been reported several times in the last few centuries, while Jack becomes aware of Toshiko's strange behaviour.

When Toshiko returns to Mary, she reveals herself as an alien, an exiled dissident, and that the artefact is a transporter that can help her to leave the planet. Mary asks Toshiko to take her to Torchwood so she can retrieve the artefact herself. At the Hub, they find that Jack has deduced that Mary is an alien and the serial killer. Jack explains that the transporter carried a prisoner, Mary, and a guard, which Mary killed before taking the body of a human woman. Mary holds Toshiko at knife point, demanding the artefact. Jack trades Toshiko for the artefact, which Jack reprograms to send Mary to the centre of the sun. Owen and Gwen apologise to Toshiko for their behaviour to her. Jack offers Toshiko the pendant, but she smashes it underfoot.

Music
The songs "Spitting Games" by Snow Patrol (when Mary introduces herself to Toshiko, last heard in "Everything Changes"), "Sing" by Travis (when Tosh tells Mary about alien cultures & artefacts, last heard in "Ghost Machine"), "Drag" by Placebo (when Mary tells Tosh about the pendant and tells her to keep it) and "Suddenly I See" by KT Tunstall (when Mary kisses Tosh in the cafe then asks about the object from the building site) are featured in this episode.

Outside references 
 The phrase "Beware Greeks bearing gifts" refers to the Trojan horse described in Virgil's The Aeneid.

External links

 "Greeks Bearing Gifts" episode guide entry on the BBC website

Torchwood episodes
2006 British television episodes
Television episodes written by Toby Whithouse